Margaret ("Peggy") Storrar (born February 20, 1971 in Mahopac, New York) is a field hockey goalkeeper from the United States, who made her international senior debut for the Women's National Team in 1995. The former student of the University of North Carolina at Chapel Hill was a member of the team, that won the silver medal at the 1999 Pan American Games in Winnipeg, Manitoba, Canada. Four years later, when Santo Domingo, Dominican Republic hosted the Pan Am Games, Storrur repeated that feat.

International Senior Tournaments
 1997 – Champions Trophy, Berlin, Germany (6th)
 1998 – World Cup, Utrecht, The Netherlands (8th)
 1999 – Pan American Games, Winnipeg, Canada (2nd)
 2000 – Olympic Qualifying Tournament, Milton Keynes, England (6th)
 2001 – Pan American Cup, Kingston, Jamaica (2nd)
 2002 – Champions Challenge, Johannesburg, South Africa (5th)
 2002 – World Cup, Perth, Australia (9th)
 2003 – Champions Challenge, Catania, Italy (5th)
 2003 – Pan American Games, Santo Domingo, Dominican Republic (2nd)
 2004 – Olympic Qualifying Tournament, Auckland, New Zealand (6th)

External links
 Profile on US Field Hockey

1971 births
Living people
American female field hockey players
Female field hockey goalkeepers
People from Mahopac, New York
North Carolina Tar Heels field hockey players
Pan American Games medalists in field hockey
Pan American Games silver medalists for the United States
Medalists at the 1999 Pan American Games
Field hockey players at the 1999 Pan American Games